Crehen is a village of Wallonia and a district of the municipality of Hannut, Belgium.

External links
Crehen, Hannut Official website 

Former municipalities of Liège Province
Hannut